The Constitutional Court is the supreme interpreter of the Spanish Constitution, with the power to determine the constitutionality of acts and statutes made by any public body, central, regional, or local in Spain. It is defined in Part IX (sections 159 through 165) of the Constitution of Spain, and further governed by Organic Laws 2/1979 (Law of the Constitutional Court of 3 October 1979), 8/1984, 4/1985, 6/1988, 7/1999 and 1/2000. The court is the "supreme interpreter" of the Constitution, but since the court is not a part of the Spanish Judiciary, the Supreme Court is the highest court for all judicial matters.

Powers
The Constitutional Court is authorized to rule on the constitutionality of laws, acts, or regulations set forth by the national or the regional parliaments. It also may rule on the constitutionality of international treaties before they are ratified, if requested to do so by the Government, the Congress of Deputies, or the Senate. The Constitution further declares that individual citizens may appeal to the Constitutional Court for protection against governmental acts that violate their "fundamental rights or freedoms". Only individuals directly affected can make this appeal, called a recurso de amparo, and they can do this only after exhausting judicial appeals.  Public officials, specifically "the President of the Government, the Defender of the People, fifty Members of Congress, fifty Senators, the Executive body of an Autonomous Community and, where applicable, its Assembly", may also request that the court determine the constitutionality of a law. The General Electoral Law of June 1985 additionally allows appeals to this court in cases where electoral boards exclude candidates from the ballot.

In addition, this court has the power to preview the constitutionality of texts delineating statutes of autonomy and to settle conflicts of jurisdiction between the central and the autonomous community governments, or between the governments of two or more autonomous communities. Because many of the constitutional provisions pertaining to autonomy questions are ambiguous and sometimes contradictory, this court could play a critical role in Spain's political and social development. The decisions of the Constitutional Court cannot be appealed by anyone.

Composition
This court consists of twelve magistrates (justices) who serve for nine-year terms. Four of these are nominated by the Congress of Deputies, four by the Senate, two by the executive branch of the government, and two by the General Council of the Judiciary; all are formally appointed by the King.  The Constitution sets a minimum standard of fifteen years of experience in fields related to jurisprudence, including "magistrates and prosecutors, university professors, public officials and lawyers," and must not contemporaneously hold a position that may detract from their independence, such as a post in a political party or a representative position. 

Amongst and by the magistrates of the court, a President is elected for a three-year term, who is assisted by a Vice President, who is also magistrate, and a secretary-general, that is the responsible for overseeing the staff of the court.

Current magistrates 
The Constitutional Court consists of a president, currently Cándido Conde-Pumpido, the vice president, currently Inmaculada Montalbán Huertas and ten magistrates (whom can be judges or jurists with relevant experience).

Notable decisions
In 2005, the court ruled that the Spanish judicial system could handle cases concerning crimes against humanity, such as genocide, regardless of whether Spanish citizens were involved or directly affected.  In this instance, it reversed the decision made by the Supreme Court in the same case, which held that such cases could be brought before Spanish courts only if a Spanish victim was involved.

In 2005, a challenge before the Court was presented denouncing the Same-sex Marriage Act of 2005 arguing that the Constitution says that «men and women have the right to marry with full legal equality» and this didn't allow same-sex marriages. In 2012, after seven years of study, the Court rule that the Constitution allows same-sex marriages because the social concept of marriage had evolved so the Constitution must to be interpreted according to the current cultural values.

A controversial decision in 2010 declaring unconstitutional few articles of the Statute of Autonomy of Catalonia has been a source of much controversy and conflict since then, with some arguing that the judgement was illegitimate due to the removal of a judge and three more judges having their terms expired.

In 2017, the court ordered those responsible for the referendum on November 9, 2014 to pay 5 million euros. In addition, social agents from Spain have demanded that the distribution of public funds in the Catalan press should be audited.

In 2022, the court blocked draft legislation which would have made changes to the General Council of the Judiciary. The move to prevent the legislation was condemned by Prime Minister Pedro Sánchez, who said he would use "whatever means necessary" to resolve the crisis.

See also
Austrian System
Judiciary
Rule of law
Rule according to higher law

Notes

References

External links

Official website

Courts in Spain
Spain
Spain